René Bégin (July 2, 1912 – November 18, 1981) was a Canadian politician and wholesaler. He was elected to the House of Commons of Canada in the 1957 election as a Member of the Liberal Party for the riding of Quebec West. He lost the 1953 election as an Independent Liberal candidate and lost the elections of 1958 and 1962 as a Member of the Liberal Party. He was born in Quebec City, Quebec, Canada.

External links
 

1912 births
1980 deaths
Liberal Party of Canada MPs
Members of the House of Commons of Canada from Quebec
Politicians from Quebec City